Lough Yganavan and Lough Nambrackdarrig (Irish: Loch Gaineamháin agus Loch na mBreac Dearg) are two lakes of ecological importance in County Kerry, Ireland. In 1988, Lough Nambrackdarrig and the southern half of Lough Yganavan were designated as National Nature Reserves (areas in ha: 3.9 & 25.3). The habitats in the SAC include fixed dunes, a type of machair.

Fauna
The SAC is one of a small number of areas in which the rare Kerry Slug and Natterjack Toad are found.

References

Yganavan and Nambrackdarrig
Protected areas of County Kerry
Protected areas established in 1988
Special Areas of Conservation in the Republic of Ireland
Nature reserves in the Republic of Ireland